Nicol Stefania Sanhueza Herrera (born 13 March 1992) is a Chilean footballer who plays as a forward for Colo-Colo and the Chile women's national team.

International career
Sanhueza made her senior debut for Chile on 10 November 2018 in a 3–2 friendly win against Australia.

References 

1992 births
Living people
Chilean women's footballers
Chile women's international footballers
Women's association football forwards
Club Deportivo Palestino (women) players
Chilean expatriate women's footballers
Chilean expatriate sportspeople in Brazil
Expatriate women's footballers in Brazil